On 6 May 1999, an election was held to elect councillors to the North Warwickshire Borough Council on the same day as other local elections in the UK. It resulted in the Labour Party keeping control of the council. All 34 seats were up for election in all wards.

The Liberal Democrats also gained two seats in this election with an independent politician keeping their seat. The Conservative Party also made gains, winning 5 more seats than the last election. Labour lost almost 19% of their vote share.

References

1999 English local elections
1999
20th century in Warwickshire